Arif Habib Corporation Limited, also known as Arif Habib Group, is a Pakistani business conglomerate company based in Karachi, Pakistan. It was founded by Pakistani businessman Arif Habib.

History
Arif Habib Group started its operations as a pure capital markets firm in 1970 and was engaged in brokerage business since its inception. In 1994, it incorporated itself as the Arif Habib Securities.

In 2006, the group acquired Rupali Bank and renamed it as Arif Habib Bank.

In 2007, the Arif Habib Group was considered a fairly large financial services conglomerate in Pakistan. It owned one large asset management company, a big investment bank, a securities brokerage firm and a retail bank. During the 2008 worldwide financial crisis, it was at brink of collapse.

In 2010, the group merged its investment arm, Arif Habib Investments, with MCB Asset Management to form the MCB-Arif Habib Savings and Investments Limited.

The group currently consists of 13 companies spanning the real estate, financial services, energy, cement, steel and fertiliser production sectors.

As of 2012, it had over 11,000 employees and an annual revenue of Rs. 100 billion.

Companies
 Aisha Steel Mills
 Sachal Energy Wind Farm
 Silk Bank
 Power Cement
 Arif Habib Corporation
 Arif Habib Consultancy
 Arif Habib Limited
 MCB-Arif Habib Savings and Investments
 Fatima Fertilizers 
 Pakarab Fertilizers
 Javedan Corporation
 Arif Habib Commodities

References

Conglomerate companies of Pakistan
Companies based in Karachi
Pakistani companies established in 1970
Holding companies established in 1970
Companies listed on the Pakistan Stock Exchange